The Dauphin River is a river of Manitoba, Canada. The Dauphin is part of the connection from Lake Manitoba to Lake Winnipeg. The Fairford River flows from Portage Bay in Lake Manitoba through to Lake St. Martin then the Dauphin River continues northeastward from Lake St. Martin into Lake Winnipeg. The two streams parallel Manitoba Provincial Road 513 much of the way. The Fairford River passes through the Rural Municipality of Grahamdale in its flow eastward.

Water Survey of Canada has operated a hydrometric station on the Dauphin River near the community of Dauphin River (52°0'7" N, 98°19'47" W) since 1977.

See also
List of rivers of Manitoba

References

 https://www.gov.mb.ca/inr/publications/community_profiles/pubs/dauphin-river-2016.pdf
 http://www.dauphinriver.northcentralmb.ca/
 https://www.irtc.ca/dauphin-river-first-nation/

Rivers of Manitoba